Siege of Port-au-Prince may refer to:

 Siege of Port-au-Prince (1793)
 Siege of Port-au-Prince (1803)